Laura Kasischke is an American fiction writer and poet.  She is best known for writing the novels Suspicious River, The Life Before Her Eyes and White Bird in a Blizzard, all of which have been adapted to film.

Life and work
She was born in Grand Rapids, Michigan.
Kasischke attended the University of Michigan (MFA 1987) and Columbia University. She lives in Chelsea, Michigan, with her husband and son.

She is the Theodore Roethke Distinguished University Professor of English Language and Literature, and of the Residential College at the University of Michigan in Ann Arbor, Michigan.

Kasischke's literary works have been recognized and highlighted at Michigan State University in their Michigan Writers Series.

Her novel The Life Before Her Eyes is the basis for the film of the same name, directed by Vadim Perelman, and starring Uma Thurman and Evan Rachel Wood. Kasischke's work is particularly well received in France, where she is widely read in translation. Her novel A moi pour toujours (Be Mine) was published by Christian Bourgois, and was a national best seller.

Her most recent book of poetry, Where Now - New and Selected Poems, was published in 2017 by Copper Canyon Press.

Awards
Kasischke was awarded the 2011 National Book Critics Circle Award in poetry for Space, In Chains. Her work has received the Juniper Prize, the Alice Fay di Castagnola Award from the Poetry Society of America, the Pushcart Prize, the Elmer Holmes Bobst Award for Emerging Writers, and the Beatrice Hawley Award.  She is the recipient of two fellowships from the National Endowment for the Arts. In 2005 she was The Frost Place poet in residence and in 2009 she was awarded a Guggenheim Fellowship in Creative Arts - Poetry

Bibliography

Poetry

 Fire and Flower (Alice James Books, 1998)
 What It Wasn't (Carnegie Mellon University Press, 2002)
 
 
 
 
 The Infinitesimals (Copper Canyon Press, 2014) 
 Where Now: New and Selected Poems (Copper Canyon Press, 2017)

Fiction

Novels

 
 
 
 Be Mine (Mariner Books, 2007)

Short story collections

Short stories

Screenplays
Suspicious River

References

External links
 The Writer's Almanac with Garrison Keillor > Bike Ride with Older Boys'' by Laura Kasischke
 Boston Review > Review by Stephen Burt of Lilies Without by Laura Kasischke
 The Iowa Review > Laura Kasischke > Zeus
 Laura Kasischke: Poetry Foundation > Author

Living people
20th-century American novelists
20th-century American poets
20th-century American women writers
University of Michigan faculty
American women novelists
American women poets
National Endowment for the Arts Fellows
The Magazine of Fantasy & Science Fiction people
University of Michigan alumni
Novelists from Michigan
Columbia University alumni
21st-century American poets
Poets from Michigan
Writers from Grand Rapids, Michigan
21st-century American novelists
21st-century American women writers
American women academics
Year of birth missing (living people)